Carta Worldwide is a Canadian financial technology company that offers digital payments technology and modern card issuer processing for banks and financial technology "fintech" companies. In addition to their Canadian headquarters in Toronto, Carta has offices in London, Casablanca, and Charlottetown, PEI.  Carta operates internationally, providing financial technology and digital payment software and cloud API issuer processing.

Carta's clients include Vodafone, PayPal, Banco Sabadell, Westpac NZ, and Novum Bank, nets, TransferWise, and Sodexo.  The company also partners with Visa and MasterCard.

Carta was the world's first processor to complete integration to MasterCard MOTAPS, enabling rapid deployment for NFC programs. Their Charlottetown, PEI, data centre is the only secure third party issuer processing data host for financial services in Canada.

Carta was part of the development team that produced ApplePay and was the first processor in the world to perform an ApplePay transaction.

History

Carta was founded in 2006 in Canada by Frank Svatousek, Robert Elensky, and Rui Mendes. Company's headquarters were setup in Oakville, Ontario, Canada and relocated in to Switzerland with service company offices opened in Hong Kong and London, UK.

In 2009, Brian Semkiw was appointed as CEO. Brian Semkiw is the co-founder of Rand Worldwide which had 1500 employees and had secured revenues of approximately $500 million by the time it was privatized in 2007. Profit Magazine named Semkiw "Entrepreneur of the Year" in 1996.

On September 15, 2014, Carta Worldwide closed the first tranche of a $12 million Series D venture round. Led by Toronto-based merchant bank Difference Capital and DC Thomson (UK), the $7-million investment adds to the more than $50 million the company has invested in its digital transaction processing platform.

In 2015 Carta partnered with Visa Inc. and Vodafone to enable contactless bank card payments. The Vodafone wallet uses a hybrid of a hardware SIM card and cloud-based tokenization. Carta Worldwide enabled groundbreaking digital payments launch that allowed PayPal accounts to transact across Visa network in Europe. Also in 2015, Carta Worldwide has named Elizabeth Duke as new Vice President of Business Development.

In July 2018,  Carta Worldwide announced that Brian Semkiw resigned as CEO issuing in a change in global leadership, with Paul Hill appointed as the new CEO. After Paul Hill leaves to begin the next phase of his life, Peter Kaju assumes role as Chief Executive Officer June 1, 2020.

In January 2021, Carta was acquired by Mogo Financial for 10 million Mogo shares valuing the transaction in excess of $100 million. CAD.

Management 

 Allan Smith - Head of Carta Worldwide
 Giles Sutherland - Chief Revenue Officer
 Richard Wray - Chief Customer Officer
 Adil Benlamlih - Chief Technology Officer
 Peter Kaju - Ex-Chief Executive Officer

Source:

Awards

|-
| 2013
| Carta Worldwide - NFC Virtual Prepaid Platform
| Best Virtual Campaign - Payment Exchange Prepaid & Payments Awards
| 
|-
| 2014
| Carta Worldwide 
| Best Contactless Solution - Emerging Payment Awards
| 
|-
| 2014
| Carta Worldwide
| Best Payment Technological Innovation - Emerging Payment Awards 
|
|-
| 2014
| PayWith, Carta Worldwide
| Best Virtual or Mobile Program - Payments Exchange Prepaid & Payment Awards
| 
|-
| 2014
| Carta Worldwide Host Card Emulation (HCE) with Remote Secure Element (RSE) for NFC
| Best Prepaid & Payments Innovation - Payments Exchange Prepaid & Payment Awards 
| 
|-
| 2014
| Bread4Scrap - Payment Card Solutions (Carta Worldwide)
| Boundary Buster - PayBefore Awards Europe
| 

|-
| 2015
| DCR Strategies - TruCash Wallet (MasterCard & Carta Worldwide)
| Breakout Company of the Year - PayBefore Awards 
| 
|-
| 2015
| DCR Strategies - TruCash Wallet (MasterCard & Carta Worldwide)
| Gotta-Have Mobile App of the Year - PayBefore Awards 
| 
|-
| 2015
| By The Booth - Carta Worldwide (Mobile Payments Commercial)
| Marketing (Product) Video - AVA Digital Awards (Platinum)
| 
|-
| 2015
| By The Booth - Carta Worldwide (Mobile Payments Commercial) 
| Marketing (Product) Video - Hermes Creative Awards (Platinum) 
| 
|-
| 2015
| Carta Worldwide
| Contactless Bank Card Payments enabled on Vodafone Wallet (Oct 2015) 
| 
|-
| 2015
| Raphaels Bank, Carta Worldwide, Visa, Vodafone
| Mobile Payments Solution of the Year - Payments Awards (Nov 2015) 
| 
|-
| 2015
| Raphaels Bank, Carta Worldwide, Visa, Vodafone
| Best Contactless Payments Project - Payments Awards (Nov 2015) 
| 

|-

References

External links
 Carta Worldwide official website

Mobile payments
Smart cards
Near-field communication
Software companies of Canada